This is a list of dairy products. A dairy product is food produced from the milk of mammals. A production plant for the processing of milk is called a dairy or a dairy factory. Dairy farming is a class of agricultural, or an animal husbandry, enterprise, for long-term production of milk, usually from dairy cows, but also from goats, sheep and camels, which may be either processed on-site or transported to a dairy factory for processing and eventual retail sale.

A

B

C

D

E

F

G

H

I

J

K

L

M

P

Q

R

S

T

U

V

W

Y

Z

Unsorted

 Crema (dairy product)

See also

 List of cheeses
 List of cheesemakers
 List of countries by milk consumption per capita
 List of dairy product companies in the United States
 List of goat milk cheeses
 List of ice cream brands
 List of ice cream flavors
 List of sheep milk cheeses
 List of water buffalo cheeses
 List of yogurt-based dishes and beverages
 Lore Alford Rogers

Categories

 :Category:Brand name dairy products
 :Category:Butter
 :Category:Cheese
 :Category:Dairy products companies
 :Category:Ice cream
 :Category:Milk
 :Category:Yogurts

References

External links
 
 
 

Dairy products
Dairy Producca vaCool alorts